Pusana is a genus of grasshoppers in the subfamily Oedipodinae with species found in the Indian subcontinent.

Species 
The following species are recognised in the genus Pusana:
 Pusana chayuensis (Yin, 1984)
 Pusana laevis (Uvarov, 1921)
 Pusana rugulosa (Uvarov, 1921)

References 

Acrididae
Taxa named by Boris Uvarov